Shamokin!!! is the second album put out by Mostly Other People Do the Killing.  The quartet is led by bassist Moppa Elliot, and is the follow up to a self-titled record Mostly Other People Do the Killing from 2005 that joined all the personnel forming the band.  The album is mostly original songs with "Lover" and "A Night in Tunisia" the only covers.

Track listing
"Handsome Eddy"
"The Hop Bottom Hop"
"Shamokin"
"Dunkelbergers"
"Factoryville"
"Lover"
"Andover"
"Evans City"
"Baden"
"A Night in Tunisia"

Credits
Peter Evans - Trumpet
Jon Irabagon - Alto Saxophone
Moppa Elliot - Bass and Compositions
Kevin Shea - Drums

References

Jazz albums by American artists
2007 albums